Kota or KOTA may refer to:

People and languages
Kōta (given name), a masculine Japanese given name
Kota Brahmin, a sub-caste of Brahmins in Karnataka
Kota people (India), a tribe in the Nilgiri hills of Tamil Nadu, South India
Kota language (India), a Dravidian language spoken in the southern Indian state of Tamil Nadu
Kota people (Gabon) (Bakota) whose members live primarily in the northeastern region of Gabon in Central Africa
Kota language (Gabon), a Bantu language of the Bakota people of Gabon
Kota language (Central African Republic) (Ngando), a Bantu language of the Central African Republic
Kota Vamsa, 12th century dynasty of Amaravathi, India

Media 
KOTA (AM), a radio station (1380 AM) licensed to serve Rapid City, South Dakota, United States
KOTA-TV, a television station (channel 7, virtual 3) licensed to serve Rapid City, South Dakota
KHME, a television station (channel 2, virtual 23) licensed to serve Rapid City, South Dakota, which held the call sign KOTA-TV until 2016

Places

Brunei 
 Kota Batu, Brunei-Muara, a sub-district of Brunei-Muara District

India 
 Kota, Nellore district, mandal headquarters in Nellore district of Andhra Pradesh
 Kota mandal, Andhra Pradesh, mandal in Nellore district of Andhra Pradesh
 Kota, Bilaspur, a city in Chhattisgarh
 Kota, Karnataka, an area in Karnataka state
 Kota, Rajasthan, a city in Rajasthan state
 Kota district, a district of Rajasthan state
 Kota (Lok Sabha constituency), a Lok Sabha parliamentary constituency of Rajasthan
 Kota, Uttar Pradesh, a town in Sonbhadra district, Uttar Pradesh

Indonesia 
 Administrative division usually translated as "city", above district (kecamatan), below province, equivalent to regency (kabupaten)
 Kota Tua Jakarta, an old area in Jakarta
 Kotagede, a district in Yogyakarta

Japan 
 Kōta, Aichi, a town in Aichi Prefecture

Malaysia 
 Kota, Negeri Sembilan, a small town in Rembau, Negeri Sembilan
 Kota Bharu, the capital of Kelantal
 Kota Kinabalu, the capital of Sabah

Nepal 
 Kota, Tanahun
 Kot, Bhojpur

South China Sea 
 Kota Island

Other uses 
 Kota the Friend, a Brooklyn-based independent rapper
Association of Timorese Heroes, (Klibur Oan Timor Asu’wain, KOTA) a conservative political party in East Timor
Kota Srinivasa Rao (born 1947), Tollywood actor
Kota Junction railway station, Kota, Rajasthan
Kota the triceratops, an animatronic toy
Kota, or goahti, a native Saami (Lapp) tent, similar to a tipi
Kota Vamsa, the medieval dynasty which ruled in parts of the modern day Indian state of Andhra Pradesh
Bunny chow or kota, a South African fast food dish
Spatlo or kota, a South African sandwich

See also
 Kottas (Kote Hristov, 1863–1905), Slavophone insurgent leader in Western Macedonia
 Kouta (disambiguation)
 Kuta (disambiguation)

Language and nationality disambiguation pages